Norman Burdett Nash (June 5, 1888 – January 3, 1963) was the tenth bishop of Massachusetts in The Episcopal Church.

Early life and education
Nash was born in Bangor, Maine, on June 5, 1888, the son of the Reverend Henry Sylvester Nash and Bessie Keefler Curtis. He was educated at the Cambridge Latin School of Harvard College and at Williams College. He graduated with a Bachelor of Divinity from Episcopal Theological Seminary in 1915. He was awarded a Doctor of Sacred Theology from Western Theological Seminary, Williams College and Trinity College, respectively.

Ordination
Nash was ordained deacon on May 27, 1915 and priest on October 4, 1916 by the bishop of Massachusetts William Lawrence. After ordination he became professor of Christian social ethics at the Episcopal Theological Seminary and in 1939 became rector of St Paul's school in Concord, New Hampshire.

Bishop
Nash was elected Coadjutor Bishop of Massachusetts on the first ballot during a special convention that took place in St Paul's Cathedral in Boston in December 1946. He was consecrated on February 14, 1947, by Presiding Bishop Henry Knox Sherrill in Trinity Church, Boston. He became diocesan that same year and remained in the post till 1956.

References

1888 births
1963 deaths
Episcopal Divinity School alumni
Williams College alumni
Harvard College alumni
20th-century American Episcopalians
Episcopal bishops of Massachusetts